Two ships of the Estonian Navy have been named Sulev:

, the former German torpedo boat A32 launched in 1916 and acquired in 1924
, the former German  Lindau launched in 1957 and acquired in 2000